The National Memorial Day Concert is a free annual concert  performed on the west lawn of the United States Capitol Building in Washington, D.C., in commemoration of Memorial Day from 1989-2019 and in 2022. In 2020 and 2021, the concert was broadcast on PBS and streamed, but was not live, as a result of the COVID-19 pandemic. It is held on a Sunday of the Memorial Day weekend. It is broadcast on PBS, and can also be seen overseas by U.S. military personnel in more than 175 countries and aboard more than 200 U.S. Navy ships at sea on American Forces Network. The concert is viewed and heard by millions across the country and the world, as well as, in every year but 2020 and 2021, attended by more than half a million people at the United States Capitol.

The concert usually begins with the American national anthem by the National Symphony Orchestra and the U.S. Army Herald Trumpets, accompanied by a recording artist, followed by music and dramatic readings. The concert's finale includes a performance of the Armed Forces Medley by the National Symphony Orchestra, accompanied by The U.S. Army Chorus, The U.S. Navy Band Sea Chanters, The U.S. Air Force Singing Sergeants, and The Soldiers' Chorus of the United States Army Field Band, followed by closing remarks by the Chairman of the Joint Chiefs of Staff. The 2020 and 2021 concerts were not live because of the ongoing COVID-19 pandemic and instead featured a series of pre-recorded performances and readings along with a tribute to first-responders helping out during the pandemic.

Since its premiere the multi-award-winning television event honors the military service of all the uniformed service personnel of the Armed Forces and by extension the National Guard Bureau and their families and those who have made the ultimate sacrifice for the republic and people since the 1775 American Revolution.

National Anthem performers 
2007: Josh Turner
2010: Yolanda Adams
2011: Pia Toscano
2012: Jessica Sanchez
2013: Candice Glover
2014: Caleb Johnson
2015: Nick Fradiani
2016: Trent Harmon
2017: Auliʻi Cravalho
2018: Spensha Baker
2019: Alyssa Raghu
2020: Christopher Jackson
2021: Mickey Guyton
2022: Pia Toscano

See also
A Capitol Fourth

References

External links
 "National Memorial Day Concert" Official Site
 "Architect Of The Capitol"

Concerts in the United States
PBS original programming
NPR
1989 establishments in Washington, D.C.